Jakub Kadák (born 14 December 2000) is a Slovak professional footballer who plays as an attacking midfielder for Swiss Super League club Luzern. He also plays for the Slovakia under-21 team.

Club career
Kadák made his Fortuna Liga debut for AS Trenčín against Spartak Trnava on 10 March 2018. Trenčín lost the game to the later champions 1–2. Kadák replaced Lukáš Skovajsa in the 80th minute.

On 18 July 2022, Kadák joined Swiss Super League club Luzern, signing a four-year contract.

International career
Kadák was first recognised in a senior national team nomination on 16 March 2022 by Štefan Tarkovič as an alternate ahead of two international friendly fixtures against Norway and Finland. During the March international fixtures, Kadák ended up representing the Slovak U21 side under Jaroslav Kentoš in 2023 Under-21 European Championship qualifiers against Northern Ireland and Spain, being called up on the 17 March. He was also an alternate for June fixtures.

References

External links
 AS Trenčín official profile
 Futbalnet profile
 
 

2000 births
Living people
Sportspeople from Trenčín
Slovak footballers
Slovak expatriate footballers
Slovakia youth international footballers
Slovakia under-21 international footballers
Association football midfielders
AS Trenčín players
FC Luzern players
Slovak Super Liga players
Swiss Super League players
Expatriate footballers in Switzerland
Slovak expatriate sportspeople in Switzerland